Julia Parrish  is an ecologist and conservation biologist at the University of Washington known for her research on seabirds and for her leadership in citizen science. She is an elected fellow of the American Association for the Advancement of Science.

Education and career 
Parrish has an undergraduate degree from Carnegie-Mellon (1982) where she studied biochemistry and biophysics. While she was an undergraduate student, she spent a period of time at the Duke University Marine Laboratory, which she credits for guiding her towards getting her Ph.D. at Duke University studying the schooling behavior of fish. Parrish moved to the University of Washington where she holds the Lowell A. and Frankie L. Wakefield Endowed Professorship.

Research 
Parrish's research is a combination of observational research and conservation activities. Her graduate research centered on fish where she examined mucus production by the Atlantic silverside fish and the importance of physical location within schooling groups of fish. Parrish began working on Tatoosh Island in 1990 after an invitation to the island from a graduate student in Bob Paine's lab. Her work on the island focuses on common murres, a seabird that forms dense nesting colonies on the island. She has examined  interactions between bald eagles and common murres and noted declines in the common murre population as a result of the recovery of the bald eagles. Parrish has modeled the role of aggregating animals in the survival of organisms and its subsequent implications for marine protected areas in the conservation of marine species. Parrish's research has linked dead birds found on the beach with changing seawater off California, the presence of harmful algal blooms, and marine heatwaves. Through the collection of data from volunteers, Parrish was able to link recent observations of the by-the-wind sailor jellyfish with seawater conditions off the beaches of California.

Citizen science 

Parrish founded and directs the Coastal Observation and Seabird Survey Team, COASST, a citizen science project started in 1999 that organizes volunteers to gather details about dead birds and marine debris on beaches along the west coast of the United States. Parrish's activities include research into the scale of citizen science projects, the value of in-kind contributions made by volunteers, factors limiting the use of data collected by citizen scientists, and demographic factors leading to the success of data collection by citizen science projects.

Selected publications

Awards and honors 
Aldo Leopold Fellow (2006)
Fellow, Ecological Society of America (2016)
Fellow, American Association for the Advancement of Science (2019)
Lifetime Achievement Award, Pacific Seabird Group (2019)
One of 12 “Champions of Change” honored at The White House (2013)

References

External links 

 , December 23, 2020 [up to 17:36 in video]
 COASST web site

Fellows of the American Association for the Advancement of Science
Living people
Duke University alumni
Carnegie Mellon University alumni
University of Washington faculty
Women ecologists
American ornithologists
American marine biologists
Conservation biologists
Year of birth missing (living people)